The Maui Film Festival is a film festival held annually on the island of Maui, Hawaii. It was founded in 2000 by Barry Rivers.   Past attendees include Bryan Cranston, Freida Pinto, Connie Britton, and Pierce Brosnan.

The Maui Film Festival is nicknamed “Cinema-Under-the-Stars” because of its location on Maui, one of the eight Hawaiian Islands. The festival takes place annually over five days in June. It is based at Grand Wailea Resort and includes film premieres, filmmaker panels, special screenings, tributes, award ceremonies, culinary arts celebrations, and private soirees.

History 

The festival originated from a weekly screening series that director Barry Rivers began in 1997. Rivers had previously studied Film & Media Arts at University of Massachusetts Amherst.

Program 

The festival consists of filmmakers submitting features and shorts which the programmers choose 50 of to be screened over the five-day program. Certain filmmakers, actors, and actresses receive awards based on who the programmers think best fits the award criteria for that year. The Maui Film Festival has been reported to be inviting to the audience, filmmakers, and celebrities; as well as not involving many journalists.

Venues 
The Maui Film Festival screens many of its films outdoors and Celestial Cinema is the festival's main venue. Films are also projected onto a 50-foot screen set on the Gold & Emerald Golf Course [5]. Its outdoor location can hold 2,500+ people. Attendees bring lawn chairs and blankets to sit on the grass as they watch the film.

In addition, the festival has two venues at the Maui Arts and Cultural Center. The first venue, Castle Theater, dubbed ‘Maui’s Movie Palace’, is the Center's principal performance space and seats 1,200 people in its multi tiered configuration. The second venue at the Maui Arts and Cultural Center is the McCoy Studio Theater, dubbed 'black box' because of its smaller space seating no more than 250 people. 

There is also the Toes in the Sand Cinema on Wailea Beach in front of the Four Seasons Maui at Wailea. It holds a free community screening that usually features a program of short films [8].

Events 
The festival includes many events. It begins with an Opening Night Twilight Reception at Grand Wailea Resort.

Awards and honors 
The Maui Film Festival honors film artists, actors, and actresses for achievements.

Lights! Camera! Action! Award: Honors directors. Winners include Olivia Wilde.

Maverick Award: Honors actors and actresses who promote activism in protecting the Earth.

Navigator Award: Honors film actors and actresses. Winners include Gina Rodriguez.

Nova Award: Honors film actors/actresses. Winners include Jessica Chastain and Paul Rudd.

Pathfinder Award: Honors actors and actresses. Pierce Brosnan received this award, making him the first two-time honoree at the Maui Film Festival after also winning the Maverick Award [12].

Rainmaker Award: Honors actors/actresses. In 2016, Michael B. Jordan was awarded the Rainmaker Award for his powerful and emotional lead roles in ‘Fruitvale Station’ and ‘Creed.’

Rising Star Award: Honors young actors and actresses. Winners include Garrett Hedlund, Karen Gillan, Nick Robinson and Maya Erskine.

Shining Star Award: Honors film actors and actresses. Past winners have been Zac Efron, Andrew Garfield, Olivia Wilde, Emma Roberts, Amber Heard and Awkwafina.

Shooting Star Award: Honors an actor in a Maui Film Festival Hawaii Premiere. Winners include Joe Manganiello.

Visionary Award: Honors actors and actresses. Winners include Louie Schwartzberg.

References 
 “Schmooze.” Merriam-Webster, Merriam-Webster, www.merriam-webster.com/dictionary/schmooze.
 “Maui Now: 2018 Maui Film Festival ‘Toes in the Sand Cinema.’” Maui Now | Ask a Maui Doctor: How Much Poke Is Too Much?, mauinow.com/2018/06/14/2018-maui-film-festival-toes-in-the-sand-cinema-tonight/.

References

Tourist attractions in Maui County, Hawaii
2000 establishments in Hawaii
Film festivals established in 2000
Film festivals in Hawaii